"You Ain't Livin' till You're Lovin'" is a 1968 single released on the Tamla-Motown label by Motown vocal duo Marvin Gaye and Tammi Terrell.

The song gave the duo a boost in the UK where the single was released. Motown's stateside headquarters issued the song as the b-side to the hit "Keep On Lovin' Me Honey". The song eventually reached the top thirty on the UK Top 50 peaking at number twenty-one.

It was the fourth and final release from the duo's best-selling album You're All I Need, and was later covered by Diana Ross and the Supremes and The Marvelettes.

Credits
Lead vocals by Marvin Gaye and Tammi Terrell
Backing vocals by The Andantes and The Originals
Produced by Ashford & Simpson
Instrumentation by The Funk Brothers

1968 singles
Marvin Gaye songs
Tammi Terrell songs
Songs written by Nickolas Ashford
Songs written by Valerie Simpson
Male–female vocal duets
1968 songs
Tamla Records singles